David Willey may refer to:

 David Willey (physicist) (born 1947), physicist and entertainer
 David Willey (cricketer) (born 1990), English cricketer
 David Willey (journalist), British reporter for the BBC

See also 
 The Tank Museum, curator David Willey
 David Wiley (disambiguation)